Eduardo Garduño Gómez (born 2 October 1928, date of death unknown) was a Mexican footballer. He competed in the men's tournament at the 1948 Summer Olympics.

References

External links
 
 

1928 births
Year of death missing
Mexico international footballers
Olympic footballers of Mexico
Footballers at the 1948 Summer Olympics
Sportspeople from Cuernavaca
Footballers from Morelos
Association football midfielders
Club América footballers
Mexican footballers